Schock may refer to:

People with the surname
Aaron Schock (born 1981), American politician
Axel Schock (born 1965), German author
Gina Schock (born 1957), American drummer
Harriet Schock (fl. from 1970s), American singer/songwriter
Rudolf Schock (1915-1986), German tenor
Rolf Schock (1933-1986), philosopher and artist
Ron Schock (born 1943), Canadian ice hockey player

Art, entertainment, and media
Schock (album), by the German band Eisbrecher

Organizations
W. D. Schock Corp, an American sailboat manufacturer

Money
 Schock (coin), historical European coin

See also
 Shock (disambiguation)

German-language surnames